Keswick railway station was a station on the Adelaide-Wolseley line and served by Adelaide Metro Belair, Noarlunga and Tonsley line services. It was located in the inner western Adelaide suburb of Keswick, 3.8 kilometres from Adelaide station.

History
Keswick station was opened on 6 April 1913.  Within months of opening, a station master was appointed to manage bulk goods business, including firewood and sand bricks.  A ticket office was added in 1927. The station lay adjacent to Adelaide Parklands Terminal.

The station was closed and demolished in March 2013 during the closure of the Noarlunga) and Tonsley lines, in preparation for the electrification of those lines. At the time of its closure, it was the only station on the Adelaide suburban system without wheelchair access, the steep terrain and sparse patronage being prohibitive. A new Adelaide Showground station south of the Keswick Bridge opened on 17 February 2014, replacing Keswick as well as the annual temporary Showground Central station.

Services by platform

References

External links

Flickr gallery

Disused railway stations in South Australia
Keswick, South Australia
Railway stations in Australia opened in 1913
Railway stations closed in 2013